1956 in professional wrestling describes the year's events in the world of professional wrestling.

List of notable promotions 
Only one promotion held notable shows in 1956.

Calendar of notable shows

Notable events

January 6 - Heavyweight Wrestling debuts in the Northeast as the main television program of the Capitol Wrestling Corporation based from Turner's Arena in Washington, DC.
April  Arena México opens, built by Empresa Mexicana de Lucha Libre (EMLL; "Mexican Wrestling Enterprise") owner Salvador Lutteroth. Arena México became EMLL's main venue from that point forward and is referred to as the Cathedral of Lucha Libre.

Championship changes

EMLL

NWA

Debuts
Debut date uncertain:
Sandy Barr
Jody Hamilton
Smasher Sloan
Mr. Wrestling II

Births
January 10  Denny Brown 
January 11  Kuniaki Kobayashi
March 18  Rick Martel
March 21  Angel Gabriele (died in 2016) 
March 23  Ryuma Go (died in 2009) 
March 24  Teijo Khan (died in 2020)
March 28  Dangerous Danny Davis
April 5  Diamond Dallas Page
April 14  Larry Winters (died in 2015)
April 21  Vicky Williams
May 7  Hercules(died in 2004)
May 9  Frank Andersson(died in 2018)
May 11:
Espanto Jr.
Sunny War Cloud
May 14  Kasavubu (d. 1982) 
May 24  Super Parka
May 25:
Tatsutoshi Goto
El Solar
June 4  Joe Malenko
July 13  Tiger Jackson
July 19:
Randy Rose
Yoshiaki Yatsu 
July 26  Tommy Rich
July 28  Jimmy Jackson (wrestler) (died in 2008) 
August 8  Taras Bulba(died in 2016) 
September 16  Kazuharu Sonoda(died in 1987)
September 18  Súper Kendo
September 21  Ricky Morton
September 26  Richard Charland
October 12  Emilio Charles Jr. (died in 2012) 
October 22  Bob Ryder (died in 2020)
November 2  Mike Davis(died in 2001)
November 3  Korstia Korchenko 
November 6  Tony Rumble(died in 1999)
November 20  Momma Benjamin
December 20  Super Strong Machine
December 27  Masashi Aoyagi (died in 2022) 
December 31  MS-1(died in 2012)

Deaths
May 19  Jack Taylor (Canadian wrestler) (69)

References

 
professional wrestling